Typhoon Prapiroon, also known as Tropical Storm Florita in the Philippines, was a typhoon that worsened the floods in Japan and also caused impacts in neighboring South Korea. The storm formed from an area of low pressure near the Philippines, and strengthened to a typhoon before entering the Sea of Japan.

Meteorological history

On June 27 at 20:00 UTC, the Joint Typhoon Warning Center (JTWC) began monitoring a system in the Philippine Sea, giving it a low development potential. The next day at 00:00 UTC, the Japan Meteorological Agency (JMA) began issuing advisories on a tropical depression, with the JTWC upgrading its development potential to medium at 00:30 UTC. The depression continued over favorable conditions as it was steered by a mid-level subtropical high-pressure area, and on the same day at 12:00 UTC, the JTWC began issuing warnings on Tropical Depression 09W. At 18:00 UTC, the PAGASA began issuing warnings on the tropical depression, giving it the local name Florita 3 hours later at 21:00 UTC.

On June 29 at 00:00 UTC, the JMA upgraded the depression to a tropical storm, giving it the name Prapiroon. Prapiroon had good upper-level outflow, though dry air present in the area negatively affected its development. Prapiroon then turned to the northwest, and on July 1 at 00:00 UTC, the JMA upgraded Prapiroon to a severe tropical storm. On the same day at 06:00 UTC, the PAGASA issued its final warning on Prapiroon as it exited the Philippine Area of Responsibility. Later that day, a ragged eye became apparent, and at 21:00 UTC, the JTWC upgraded Prapiroon to a typhoon. Prapiroon continued developing aided by favorable conditions, and on July 2 at 00:00 UTC, the JMA upgraded Prapiroon to a typhoon. After peaking, Prapiroon began to weaken and turn to the northeast, with the JMA downgrading it to a severe tropical storm on July 3 at 06:00 UTC as conditions for development became unfavorable. The JTWC downgraded Prapiroon to a tropical storm at 15:00 UTC as its low-level circulation became exposed, with central convection becoming elongated. Prapiroon's western semicircle became completely devoid of deep convection, and by July 4 at 00:00 UTC, the JMA further downgraded it to a tropical storm. The JMA later issued its final advisory on Prapiroon at 06:00 UTC as it became extratropical, with the JTWC doing so later at 15:00 UTC. Prapiroon's extratropical remnants dissipated just south of Hokkaido the next day.

Impact

Japan

Five people were injured by the winds from the typhoon. A woman was blown away by the strong winds of the typhoon and died at a hospital she was sent to later. The typhoon also caused damages on Old Gorin Church, which as designated as heritage site four days prior, and caused damages to the stained glass in Kuroshima Catholic Church.
Agricultural damage in Okinawa Prefecture were about ¥49.39 million (US$446,000).

South Korea
1 person from South Korea was killed by the storm; one other person was declared missing.

See also

Weather of 2018
Tropical cyclones in 2018

References

External links

Tropical cyclones in 2018
2018 Pacific typhoon season